commonly known as NTT, is a Japanese telecommunications company headquartered in Tokyo, Japan. Ranked 55th in Fortune Global 500, NTT is the fourth largest telecommunications company in the world in terms of revenue, as well as the third largest publicly traded company in Japan after Toyota and Sony, as of June 2022.

The company is incorporated pursuant to the NTT Law. The purpose of the company defined by the law is to own all the shares issued by Nippon Telegraph and Telephone East Corporation (NTT East) and Nippon Telegraph and Telephone West Corporation (NTT West) and to ensure proper and stable provision of telecommunications services all over Japan including remote rural areas by these companies as well as to conduct research relating to the telecommunications technologies that will form the foundation for telecommunications.

On 1 July 2019, NTT Corporation launched NTT Ltd., an $11 billion de facto holding company business consisting of 28 brands from across NTT Security, NTT Communications and Dimension Data.

While NTT is listed on the Tokyo Stock Exchange and the OTC Markets Group's Pink (and formerly in the New York Stock Exchange under the ticker code "NTT" and in the London Stock Exchange under the ticker code "NPN"), the Japanese government still owns roughly one-third of NTT's shares, regulated by the NTT Law.

History 

Established as a state monopoly in August 1952 to take over the Japanese telecommunications system operated by AT&T during the Occupation of Japan,  was privatized in 1985 to encourage competition in the country's telecom market. In 1987, NTT made the largest stock offering to date, at US$36.8 billion.

Because NTT owns most of Japan's last mile infrastructure (incl. FTTC or FTTB/FTTH), it enjoys oligopolistic control over land lines in Japan. In order to weaken NTT, the company was divided into a holding company (NTT) and three telecom companies (NTT East, NTT West, and NTT Communications) in 1999. The NTT Law regulating NTT East and West requires them to serve only short-distance communications and obligates them to maintain telephone service all over the country. They are also obligated to lease their unused optical fiber (dark fiber) to other carriers at regulated rates. NTT Communications is not regulated by the NTT Law.

In July 2010, NTT and South African IT company Dimension Data Holdings announced an agreement of a cash offer from NTT for Dimension Data's entire issued share capital, in £2.12bn ($3.24bn) deal.

In late 2010, NTT's Japan-to-US transpacific network reached 400 Gbit/s. In August 2011, its network capacity was expanded to 500 Gbit/s.

Corporate history timeline 
1952	Nippon Telegraph and Telephone Public Corporation established
1979	INS Concept announced
1985	Nippon Telegraph and Telephone Corporation (NTT) incorporated as a private company
1987	NTT listed on the First Section of the Tokyo Stock Exchange
1988	NTT DATA Corporation started operations
1990	VI&P Concept announced
1992	NTT Mobile Communications Network, Inc. (presently NTT DOCOMO) started operations
1994	Basic Concept for the Coming Multimedia Age announced
1995	NTT DATA listed on the Second Section of the Tokyo Stock Exchange
1996	21st Century R&D Vision announced
1996	NTT DATA listed on the First Section of the Tokyo Stock Exchange
1997	Digitization of communications network in Japan completed
1998	Global Information Sharing Concept announced
1998	NTT DOCOMO listed on the First Section of the Tokyo Stock Exchange
1999	NTT's operations reorganized into a holding-company structure: businesses transferred to three new wholly owned subsidiaries (NTT East, NTT West, and NTT Communications)
2002	prefecture-based subsidiaries of NTT East and NTT West started operations
2002	"Vision for a New Optical Generation" announced
2004	NTT Urban Development Corporation listed on the First Section of the Tokyo Stock Exchange
2004	"NTT Group's Medium-Term Management Strategy" announced
2008 announcement of a new Medium-Term Management Strategy: "Road to Service Creation Business Group"

Subsidiaries 
NTT Group consists of the following major companies, divided into five segments. NTT East, NTT West, NTT Communications, NTT Docomo, and NTT Data are most major subsidiaries. NTT Docomo and NTT Data are listed on the stock markets. NTT Urban Development is a subsidiary involved in real estate. NTT Communications' business outside of Japan became part of NTT Ltd. on 1 July 2019.

Regional 

Nippon Telegraph and Telephone East Corporation (NTT East)
Nippon Telegraph and Telephone West Corporation (NTT West)

Long distance and international 
NTT Communications
NTT MSC
Verio Inc
NTT America
NTT Europe
HKNet
Plala Networks

Mobile 
NTT Docomo

Data (system integration) 
Dimension Data (now part of NTT Ltd. except in the Middle East and Africa Region)
e-shelter
Gyron Internet Ltd
NTT Data
NTT Comware
NTT Software
NTT AT
NTT IT

Information security 
 NTT Security (now part of NTT Ltd. as of the 1st July 2019) .

R&D laboratories 
Service Innovation Laboratory Group
Service Evolution Laboratories (Yokosuka)
Media Intelligence Laboratories (Yokosuka)
Software Innovation Center (Musashino and Shibaura)
Secure Platform Laboratories (Musashino)
Information Network Laboratory Group
Network Technology Laboratories (Musashino)
Network Service Systems Laboratories (Musashino)
Access Network Service Systems Laboratories (Tsukuba and Yokoska)
Energy and Environment Systems Laboratories (Atsugi)
Science and Core Technology Laboratory Group
Network Innovation Laboratories (Yokoska)
Microsystem Integration Laboratories (Atsugi)
Photonics Laboratories (Atsugi)
Communication Science Laboratories (Keihanna and Atsugi)
Basic Research Laboratories (Atsugi)
NTT Research, Inc. (East Palo Alto, California)
Physics & Informatics (PHI) Laboratory
Cryptography and Information Security (CIS) Laboratory
Medical and Health Informatics (MEI) Laboratory

Sponsorship 
 Omiya Ardija and Roasso Kumamoto (Japanese football clubs formerly affiliated with NTT)
 Dandelion Racing, Super Formula team affiliated with NTT Docomo.
 Chip Ganassi Racing in the IndyCar Series (affiliated with NTT Data, drivers include Ryan Briscoe, Tony Kanaan, Scott Dixon, Ed Jones, and Felix Rosenqvist). In 2019, NTT also became title sponsor of the series.
 NTT Pro Cycling, UCI WorldTeam cycling team based in South Africa.

See also 

Telegraph
Telephone
List of telephone operating companies

References

External links 
  
NTT Research Inc.
NTT Innovation Institute, Inc. 
NTT Disruption 
NTT Group

 
Telecommunications companies based in Tokyo
Conglomerate companies based in Tokyo
Internet service providers of Japan
Japanese brands
Defense companies of Japan
Public safety communications
Conglomerate companies established in 1985
Telecommunications companies established in 1985
Japanese companies established in 1985
Privatized companies of Japan
Companies listed on the Tokyo Stock Exchange
Companies formerly listed on the New York Stock Exchange
Companies listed on the Osaka Exchange
Telecommunications companies of Japan